The Mine No. 5 Store (Now known as Webb's Store) is a historic department store located in Van Lear, Kentucky, United States. The two-story, wood-frame building was constructed in 1918 by Consolidated Coal Company. On January 26, 1989, the structure was added to the National Register of Historic Places.

Currently, the building is owned by Herman Webb, the brother of country music star, Loretta Lynn. Tourists can also receive a tour of the childhood home of Loretta Lynn and Crystal Gayle by stopping at the store. Admission is five dollars per person.

References

Commercial buildings completed in 1918
National Register of Historic Places in Johnson County, Kentucky
Commercial buildings on the National Register of Historic Places in Kentucky
Department stores on the National Register of Historic Places
Country music museums
Company stores in the United States
1918 establishments in Kentucky